"Forever Valentine" is a song by American R&B singer Charlie Wilson, released on January 17, 2020. The song was produced by Bruno Mars, the Stereotypes and D'Mile. They also co-wrote the song along with Charlie Wilson, Micah Powell and Seth Reger. The background vocals feature Mars, Wilson and James Fauntleroy, along with others.

Background
On July 27, 2018, Wilson stated that he and Mars were working on a collaboration. Wilson said that he was having fun with the song, the result of his and Mars' "creative combustion". They started talking about the song's vibe and recorded a chorus for it, but they didn't met each other for some time afterwards due to their busy schedules. Nevertheless, after Wilson performed on selected dates of Mars' third worldwide tour, the 24K Magic World Tour, they would "sing every day at lunch time as we further hashed out the song". It was released on Urban AC on January 17, 2020. On January 23, 2020 it was sent to AC, Hot AC, Top 40 and Urban radio stations.

Credits and personnel

Personnel

Charlie Wilson – songwriting
Bruno Mars – producer, songwriting, background vocals
The Stereotypes – producer, songwriting, programmer 
D'Mile – producer, songwriting, bass, strings, background vocals
Micah Powell – songwriting, background vocals
Seth Reger – songwriting
Bianca Atterberry – background vocals
Destiny Rogers – background vocals
James Fauntleroy – background vocals

Jonathan Yip – background vocals, keyboards
Jeremy Reeves – percussion
Ray McCullough II – horn
Ray Romulus – drums 
Stevo Evans – additional keyboards, programmer
Dave Forman – guitar
Charles Moniz – guitar, engineer 
Ronald Estrada – engineer 
Gene Grimaldi – engineer
Kevin Davis – engineer

Credits:

Charts

References

2020 singles
2020 songs
Charlie Wilson (singer) songs
Songs written by Bruno Mars
Songs written by Jonathan Yip
Songs written by Ray Romulus
Songs written by Jeremy Reeves
Songs written by Charlie Wilson (singer)
Song recordings produced by the Stereotypes